St John's Church, Ranmoor is a large parish church in Ranmoor, a suburb of the City of Sheffield, England. It is a Church of England church in the Diocese of Sheffield, and it is the second church to be built on this site after the original church was destroyed by fire in 1887. 
It has a  tower and spire, the tallest church spire in Sheffield.

History
The original church built on this site was designed by E. M. Gibbs, and was opened on 24 April 1879. The building was almost entirely destroyed by fire on 2 January 1887; all that survived was the 200-foot-tall (61 m) tower and spire. 
A new church, designed by Flockton & Gibbs (the same Edward Mitchel Gibbs), was built that incorporated the old tower and spire. The church reopened on 9 September 1888; it is a Grade II* listed building.

Memorials
The War Memorial in the churchyard consists of a 16 ft Runic Cross made from unpolished Cornish granite, with carved panels on front and back designed by Mr. A.F. Watson, Sheffield.

Organ 
The organ was installed in 1888 by Sheffield builder Brindley and Foster. It is a large three-manual instrument, generally considered to be one of the finest pipe organs in the area.
In 2020, the organ underwent an extensive overhaul to repair damage caused by a partial collapse of the ceiling in October 2017.
The full specification of the pipe organ can be found at the National Pipe Organ Register.

Notable people
Monty Python actor Michael Palin listed St John's as one of his 'top seven' favourite Churches in a speech to the National Churches Trust on account of it being the Church he was baptised in and regularly attended as a child. He describes fond memories of his Father being both a chorister and bellringer there.

References

External links

St John's Church website
St John's Music website

Grade II* listed buildings in Sheffield
Grade II* listed churches in South Yorkshire
Churches in Sheffield
Church of England church buildings in South Yorkshire
Churches completed in 1879
Churches completed in 1888
19th-century Church of England church buildings